Schizoglossum is a genus of flowering plants belonging to the family Apocynaceae.

Its native range is Southern Tropical and Southern Africa.

Species
Species:

Schizoglossum amatolicum 
Schizoglossum angolense 
Schizoglossum aschersonianum 
Schizoglossum atropurpureum 
Schizoglossum austromontanum 
Schizoglossum barbatum 
Schizoglossum bidens 
Schizoglossum cordifolium 
Schizoglossum crassipes 
Schizoglossum elingue 
Schizoglossum flavum 
Schizoglossum garcianum 
Schizoglossum graminifolium 
Schizoglossum hamatum 
Schizoglossum hilliardiae 
Schizoglossum ingomense 
Schizoglossum linifolium 
Schizoglossum montanum 
Schizoglossum nitidum 
Schizoglossum peglerae 
Schizoglossum quadridens 
Schizoglossum rubiginosum 
Schizoglossum saccatum 
Schizoglossum singulare 
Schizoglossum stenoglossum 
Schizoglossum viridulum

References

Apocynaceae
Apocynaceae genera